Ronald Rock is a prominent rock, 1,145 m, along the cliff next north of Skidmore Cliff, located east of Saratoga Table in the Forrestal Range, Pensacola Mountains. Mapped by United States Geological Survey (USGS) from surveys and U.S. Navy air photos, 1956–66. Named by Advisory Committee on Antarctic Names (US-ACAN) for Ronald D. Brown, aviation structural mechanic at Ellsworth Station, winter 1957.
 

Rock formations of Queen Elizabeth Land